The Leominster by-election was a by-election held on 15–16 February 1876 for the British House of Commons constituency of Leominster in Herefordshire.

The by-election was caused by the resignation on 8 February 1875 of the serving Conservative Party MP, Richard Arkwright. After a close-fought campaign, the result was a gain for the Liberal candidate, Thomas Blake, with a majority of 85 over the Conservative, Charles Spencer Bateman Hanbury Kincaid-Lennox, brother of Lord Bateman. This came as something of a surprise as no Liberal had been elected to the constituency for the previous 25 years.

Votes

See also 
 List of United Kingdom by-elections
 Leominster constituency

References

External links

1876 in England
Leominster
1876 elections in the United Kingdom
By-elections to the Parliament of the United Kingdom in Herefordshire constituencies
19th century in Herefordshire